Jordanita is a genus of moths of the family Zygaenidae.

Selected species
 Subgenus Roccia Alberti, 1954
 Jordanita budensis (Speyer & Speyer, 1858)
 Jordanita paupera (Christoph, 1887)
 Jordanita volgensis (Möschler, 1862)
 Jordanita kurdica (Tarmann, 1987)
 Jordanita hector (Jordan, 1907)
 Jordanita notata (Zeller, 1847)
 Subgenus Gregorita Povolný & Šmelhaus, 1951
 Jordanita hispanica (Alberti, 1937)
 Jordanita algirica (Tarmann, 1985)
 Jordanita minutissima (Oberthür, 1916)
 Jordanita carolae (Dujardin, 1973)
 Jordanita rungsi (Dujardin, 1973)
 Jordanita cognata (Herrich-Schäffer, 1852)
 Jordanita benderi (Rothschild, 1917)
 Jordanita maroccana (Naufock, 1937)
 Subgenus Lucasiterna Alberti, 1961
 Jordanita cirtana (Lucas, 1849)
 Jordanita subsolana (Staudinger, 1862)
 Subgenus Rjabovia Efetov & Tarmann, 1995
 Jordanita horni (Alberti, 1937)
 Subgenus Jordanita Verity, 1946
 Jordanita syriaca (Alberti, 1937)
 Jordanita graeca (Jordan, 1907)
 Jordanita chloros (Hübner, 1813)
 Jordanita chloronota (Staudinger, 1871)
 Jordanita globulariae (Hübner, 1793)
 Jordanita tenuicornis (Zeller, 1847)
 Jordanita fazekasi Efetov, 1998
 Jordanita vartianae Malicky, 1961
 Subgenus Praviela Alberti, 1954
 Jordanita anatolica (Naufock, 1929)

Also See 

 List of moths of Great Britain (Zygaenidae)

References
 Jordanita at funet.fi

Procridinae
Zygaenidae genera